Karen Lucille Hale (born June 14, 1989) is an American actress and singer. She has received various accolades, including seven Teen Choice Awards (the most for any actress in a single series), a Gracie Award, a People's Choice Award and two Young Hollywood Awards.

After early recognition for her roles as Becca Sommers in the series Bionic Woman (2007) and Rose Baker in the series Privileged (2008–2009), Hale received her breakthrough role as Aria Montgomery in the Freeform series Pretty Little Liars (2010–2017), for which she received global stardom and critical acclaim. She starred as Stella Abbott in Life Sentence (2018), the titular character in Katy Keene (2020) and DC Lake Edmunds in Ragdoll (2021). She has appeared in films such as The Sisterhood of the Traveling Pants 2 (2008), A Cinderella Story: Once Upon a Song and Scream 4 (both 2011), and led the films Truth or Dare and Dude (both 2018), Fantasy Island (2020), and The Hating Game (2021). 

In addition to acting, Hale has also ventured into music. In 2003, she first came to prominence as one of the five winners of the reality show American Juniors, a children's spin-off of Fox's American Idol and began as a solo artist with signing Hollywood Records in 2012, on her debut studio album, Road Between (2014). She is also credited with hosting Dick Clark's New Year's Rockin' Eve from 2016 to 2021.

Early life
Hale was born on June 14, 1989, in Memphis, Tennessee, to Julie Knight and Preston Hale. She was named after one of her great-grandmothers. Her mother is a registered nurse. She has an older sister, Maggie, a step-sister, Kirby, and a step-brother Wes. Hale was homeschooled as a child. During her childhood, she took acting and singing lessons. In August 2012, Hale revealed she had suffered from an eating disorder.

Career

2003–2009: Early roles 
In 2003, Hale first appeared on television as a contestant in the Fox reality show American Juniors. On July 30, 2003, Hale finished in fourth place and part of a group of the same name formed with the top 5 finishers (Chauncey Matthews, Danielle White and Tori & Taylor Thompson) but the group disbanded in 2005, after their self-titled studio album's lackluster sales.

Hale moved to Los Angeles at age 15 in the hopes of getting a record deal. Shortly after, she started auditioning and received a minor role on Drake & Josh and other guest roles on shows such as Ned's Declassified School Survival Guide, The O.C., and How I Met Your Mother. She appeared in two episodes of the Disney Channel show Wizards of Waverly Place.

In 2007, Hale appeared in NBC's short-lived series Bionic Woman. Hale plays Becca Sommers, the younger sister of the title character Jaime Sommers (played by Michelle Ryan). The character was originally portrayed by Mae Whitman in the unaired pilot episode, after which Whitman departed the series.

In August 2008, Hale made her big screen debut in The Sisterhood of the Traveling Pants 2 portraying Effie Kaligaris, the younger sister of Lena Kaligaris (played by Alexis Bledel). Hale then appeared in The CW series Privileged as Rose Baker, with co-stars Ashley Newbrough and JoAnna Garcia. She starred in the Lifetime television film Sorority Wars.

2010–2012: Pretty Little Liars and music 

In October 2009, Hale was cast as Aria Montgomery in Pretty Little Liars, based on the book series of the same name by Sara Shepard. The television series lasted seven seasons from 2010 to 2017, with Hale's performance being praised by critics. She also received a number of awards and nominations, including seven Teen Choice Awards, a Gracie Allen Award, a People's Choice Award and a Young Hollywood Award.

In January 2010, Hale appeared as the singer Phoebe Nichols and her identical body double Vanessa Patton in the CSI: Miami episode "Show Stopper". In 2011, Hale had a cameo role as Sherrie in the slasher film Scream 4. Later, she was cast as the aspiring singer Katie Gibbs in A Cinderella Story: Once Upon a Song, the third installment of A Cinderella Story series and was released on direct-to-video in September 2011. She recorded songs for the film's soundtrack.

Throughout her career, Hale made appearances of music videos with artists: Foy Vance's "She Burns", Chase Jordan's "Lose Control (Take a Sip)" and Jackson Harris' "Come Back Down to Earth".

Hale hosted an episode of MTV's Punk'd aired on April 26, 2012, where she successfully pranked with Pretty Litte Liars co-star Ian Harding, Vanessa Hudgens and Josh Hutcherson. The same year, Hale played the voice of Periwinkle, a twin sister of Tinker Bell (voiced by Mae Whitman) in the animated Disney film Secret of the Wings. In June 2012, Hale announced that she had signed a record deal with Hollywood Records (co-partnership with DMG Nashville).

2013–present: Films and current work 

On June 11, 2013, Hale announced that she is the new Ambassador of the beauty brand Mark Girl. Hale was co-hosted for the television event shows, the Teen Choice Awards (with Darren Criss in 2013 and David Dobrik in 2019) and the 2014 MTV Video Music Awards Pre-Show with Sway Calloway. On February 18, 2014, Hale's debut studio album was announced to be called Road Between, released on June 3, 2014.

In 2015, Hale collaborated with Rascal Flatts, performed a cover of "Let It Go" from another Disney animated film Frozen and was featured on the compilation album We Love Disney. Later, Hale served as a correspondent in New Orleans and co-hosted with Ryan Seacrest in Times Square for Dick Clark's New Year's Rockin' Eve (2016–2021), making her the first millennial actress to co-host the Times Square segments.

Hale recorded two stand-alone Christmas songs "Mistletoe" and a cover of Francesca Battistelli's "You're Here", both released in 2014 and 2017, respectively.

In 2018, Hale was cast in The CW comedy-drama series Life Sentence as Stella Abbott, a woman who finds out that her terminal cancer is cured. The series which only lasted one season. The same year, Hale starred in three films, Truth or Dare, Dude and The Unicorn. On March 11, 2019, Hale was cast as the lead role in Katy Keene, based on the Archie Comics character of the same name.

In 2020, Hale starred as Melanie Cole in the supernatural horror film Fantasy Island. In 2021, Hale starred as the lead role in the romantic comedy film The Hating Game. The same year, Hale became a brand ambassador and model for lingerie company Hunkemöller.

Artistry 
Hale described music as her "first love". Her early musical influences were Christina Aguilera, Shania Twain and Faith Hill, but what ignited her interest in pursuing music was Britney Spears' "...Baby One More Time". Kristian Bush of country band Sugarland said: "She sounds like Carrie Underwood—strong with a blues side and a pop side to it. And a lot like Faith Hill."

Personal life 
In February 2023, Hale announced that she was one-year sober from alcohol.

Filmography

Film

Television

Web

Discography

Studio albums

Soundtrack albums

Singles

Other and promotional singles

Other appearances

Music videos

As lead artist

Guest appearances

Songwriting credits
Source:

Awards and nominations

References

External links

 
 
 
 
 
 

1989 births
Living people
People from Cordova, Tennessee
Actresses from Memphis, Tennessee
American child actresses
American child singers
Child pop musicians
American country singer-songwriters
American women country singers
American women pop singers
American film actresses
American television actresses
Hollywood Records artists
Jive Records artists
Singer-songwriters from Tennessee
21st-century American actresses
21st-century American singers
21st-century American women singers